Canina is a rural locality in the Gympie Region, Queensland, Australia. In the  Canina had a population of 366 people.

Geography 
Tin Can Bay Road (State Route 15) enters the locality from the south-west.  Kin Kin Road splits from Tin Can Bay Road at Canina and proceeds east ultimately to Kin Kin, while Tin Can Bay Road continues, without a route number, to the north ultimately to Tin Can Bay.

History 
In the  Canina had a population of 366 people.

References 

Gympie Region
Localities in Queensland